Buffalo Gap Historic Village is a museum complex of historic buildings in Buffalo Gap, Texas, near Abilene. Elements of the complex are listed on the National Register of Historic Places.

See also

National Register of Historic Places listings in Taylor County, Texas
List of county courthouses in Texas

References

External links

Buffalo Gap Historic Village - official site

Museums in Taylor County, Texas
History museums in Texas
American West museums in Texas
American frontier
Abilene, Texas
Open-air museums in Texas
Houses on the National Register of Historic Places in Texas
Houses completed in 1879
National Register of Historic Places in Taylor County, Texas
Recorded Texas Historic Landmarks